Serdar Apaydın (born 21 October 1966 in Turkey) is a retired Turkish professional basketball player and former assistant coach of Fenerbahçe. He is the current Head Coach of Antalya B.B.

He was famous with his spectacular 3 point shoots and helped lot of times to Turkey national basketball team.  The former shooting guard and small forward is 1.98 m. He finish his career for make his army duty in 2001.

Career
 1986-90 Çukurova Sanayi 	
 1992-93 Galatasaray
 1993-97 Ülkerspor
 1997-01 Fenerbahçe

External links 

TBLStat.net Profile

1966 births
Living people
Turkish men's basketball players
Fenerbahçe men's basketball players
Ülker G.S.K. basketball players
Galatasaray S.K. (men's basketball) players
Turkish basketball coaches
Fenerbahçe basketball coaches